Beatrix Ong MBE is a London-based British luxury fashion accessories designer, known for her 'classic with a twist' shoes .

Touted as 'The New Choo', in 2004 Ong was named by The Independent newspaper as one of the Top Ten leading shoe designers, joining the likes of Manolo Blahnik.

Beatrix Ong founded Beatrix Ong in 2002 and the debut collection, was featured in Vogue, Elle and Vanity Fair and continues to have a constant presence amongst international fashion press as well as television and film.

Early life
Beatrix Ong was born in London, England. She attended King George V School in Hong Kong and later relocated to Brighton, England. 

Later attending Central Saint Martins College of Art and Design in London, London College of Communication, Fashion Institute of Technology in New York and Cordwainers College in London.

Career

2002–2008 
Beatrix Ong began her career in fashion as an intern at Harper's Bazaar in New York. At age 22 she became Creative Director at Jimmy Choo Couture. After assisting British handbag designer Lulu Guinness design her much acclaimed first footwear collection, Beatrix Ong launched her eponymous label in 2002.

2004, the first Beatrix Ong boutique opened in London's Primrose Hill. Later that year she was commissioned by the Financial Times to design a boot that was displayed in their London offices. 2005, Beatrix created an illustration for Buena Vista International and its film release Hitchhiker's Guide to the Galaxy. The illustration was showcased at 'The Hitchhiker's Guide to the Galaxy Science Museum Exhibition' in London.

2007, The Beatrix Ong flagship boutique moved to the oldest arcade in the world, Burlington Arcade, in Mayfair, London. The launch party was attended by British socialites including Poppy Delevingne. DJs included Al Doyle of Hot Chip and LCD Soundsystem.

2008–2013 
Beatrix Ong started her collaboration with Dover Street Market with shoes exclusively for London's leading style emporium.  2009 also saw the launch of the new limited edition shoe boxes. Illustrator Neal Murren, who previously worked for Jil Sander, Prada and Levi's, created the new boxes inspired by Beatrix. They became collectors items, as with the previous boxes illustrated by Natasha Law.

2009 saw Beatrix Ong customise Nike iD Blazer Trainers that were available for a limited period only, which became highly collectable.  Ong also joined forces with handmade luxury luggage brand Globe-Trotter to create an exclusive special edition range of travel cases. In November 2009, the Beatrix Ong concept store was launched in London's Newburgh Quarter Carnaby Street, London.

After providing the Autumn/Winter 2010 show shoes for British heritage brand, Aquascutum, Beatrix Ong announced her commission from Aquascutum to design and produce shoes for both men and women. It was the first time in Aquascutum's 160-year history that a footwear collection was designed for them. This was followed by a Beatrix Ong shop-in-shop being opened within the Aquascutum flagship shop on Regent Street, London.

Ong's portrait was taken by acclaimed musician and photographer, Bryan Adams and again by another legendary musician – 80's icon Boy George for the Hep C Trust's 'Get Tested' Campaign in 2011.

The end of 2010 saw the opening of the Beatrix Ong store at 188 Pavilion Road, Chelsea, London.

In 2011, at only 34 years old, Ong was appointed Member of the Order of the British Empire (MBE) in Her Majesty The Queen's 2011 New Year Honours for services to the fashion industry.

Ong also presented the Royal Wedding of Catherine Middleton to Prince William in April with James Chau for Central Chinese Television. It made history as the first broadcast of a Royal and religious event to China and is said to have captured an audience of 200 million viewers in China alone. Prior to the broadcast Ong was invited to design the shoes for the limited Princess Catherine dolls, which cast much speculation on Ong designing the Royals' wedding shoes, despite Ong denying the claims.

2013–2015 
2013, Beatrix Ong joined the then, Mayor of London, Boris Johnson, Chancellor of the Exchequer, George Osborne and UK Prime Minister, David Cameron on delegations to China to promote British creativity. In the following year Ong curated and designed the Water Pavilion, a retail space in Suzhou, China.

In April 2015, Ong was a member of the delegation of His Royal Highness Prince William, The Duke of Cambridge to China as part of the GREAT Festival of Creativity.

Beatrix Ong collaborated with Grey Goose Vodka to produce a limited bottle, which sold in auction to benefit the Central St Martins Scholarship Fund.

2015, SpongeBob by Beatrix Ong was launched at colette Paris. The collaboration with Nickelodeon & Viacom Consumer Products consists of a luxury range of SpongeBob SquarePants accessories, homewares and selection of apparel.  The five-year agreement saw the designer release a collection of products in selected retailers and international territories including Europe, Asia and North America.

In October 2015, Beatrix Ong launched The New Concept Collection with the Design Museum in London. The shoes are sustainably made using recycled, reused and excess stock of materials.

2016-Present 
In April 2016, Ong was commissioned by Wallpaper* Magazine to design furniture for its Handmade issue. The piece was included at the Wallpaper* Hotel exhibition during Salone del Mobile, in Milan. 'Shoe Tree', Ong's first foray into furniture was a success and was displayed in numerous design museums around the world including Triennale, Milan and continues to be sold worldwide.

Inspired by some time in Gansbaai, South Africa,  Ong went on to design the 'Water Vessel', a bottle made from recycled coffee cups. It too was displayed in Milan with Wallpaper* Magazine Handmade in 2018.

Through Ong's ongoing work and research into sustainability, a second brand was launched in 2019 named the company of X, its products consisting of homeware and fashion, are designed by Beatrix along with various collaborators, suppliers and social enterprises. 

A Bee and A Tree is Ong's first published book by Amazon. A picture book about the adventures of a bee, it's a tale for all ages about resilience and self belief.

Personal life
Beatrix Ong became a committee member of the English National Ballet from 2010 to 2013. She is currently a member of the Gala Committees for the London College of Fashion, the British Film Institute and Historical Royal Palaces. Ong also sits on the Development and Communications Committee for the Design Museum, London.

Beatrix Ong is also an Honorary Freeman of one of the oldest Livery Companies in the United Kingdom, The Worshipful Company of Cordwainers, prior to receiving Freedom of the City of London in 2012.

References

External links
beatrixong.com

Shoe designers
British fashion designers
British businesspeople
British people of Chinese descent
Artists from London
People educated at Roedean School, East Sussex
Privately held companies of the United Kingdom
1976 births
Living people
Fashion Institute of Technology alumni
Members of the Order of the British Empire
Alumni of King George V School, Hong Kong